The Sarajevo Film Festival is the premier and largest film festival in Southeast Europe, and is one of the largest film festivals in Europe. It was founded in Sarajevo in 1995 during the siege of Sarajevo in the Bosnian War, and brings international and local celebrities to Sarajevo every year. It is held in August and showcases an extensive variety of feature and short films from around the world. The current director of the festival is Jovan Marjanović.

History

In October 1993, a ten-day Sarajevo International Film Festival was held, directed by Haris Pašović of MESS. The success of this event, combined with the legacy of Mirsad Purivatra's and Izeta Građević's wartime film screenings from 1992, led to the establishment of an annual festival.

The first Sarajevo Film Festival was held from 25 October to 5 November 1995. At that time, the siege of Sarajevo was still going on and attendance projections were very low. However, a surprising 15,000 people came to see the films, of which there were 37 from 15 different countries. The festival grew at a remarkable pace, now being the most prominent film festival in Southeast Europe, attracting more than 100,000 people annually on all programs and screening hundreds of films from 60 countries.

The Sarajevo Film Festival is hosted at the National Theatre in front of which the Festival Square and the red carpet are located, with screenings at the Open-air theater Metalac, Bosnian Cultural Center, and five other cinemas and projection locations around the city. The festival has been attended by celebrities such as Robert De Niro, Angelina Jolie, Brad Pitt, Emile Hirsch, Orlando Bloom, Daniel Craig, Danny Glover, John Malkovich, Morgan Freeman, Oliver Stone, John Cleese, Steve Buscemi, Michael Fassbender, Jeremy Irons, Bono Vox, Nick Cave, Coolio, Stephen Frears, Mickey Rourke, Michael Moore, Gérard Depardieu, Darren Aronofsky, Sophie Okonedo, Gillian Anderson, Kevin Spacey, Eric Cantona, Benicio del Toro, Tim Roth, Mads Mikkelsen, Jesse Eisenberg and many others.

By 2001, the European Film Association made the Sarajevo Film Festival one of the eleven festivals that could nominate a film for the award of "Europe's Best Short Film". The 2001 winner of the Sarajevo Film Festival, Danis Tanović's No Man's Land, went on to win an Oscar in the United States. In 2004, the Best Movie Award was named the "Heart of Sarajevo".

Beginning with the 13th Sarajevo Film Festival in 2007 and in cooperation with the Berlin International Film Festival and Berlinale Talent Campus, the Sarajevo Talent Campus has been added to the festival. In 2014, the Sarajevo Talent Campus got renamed to "Talents Sarajevo". Talents Sarajevo is an educational and creative platform for up and coming young film professionals, and has eventually come to be revered as the most prestigious film training event in the region.

The festival also features CineLink, a year-long project development program resulting in an annual co-production market during the festival dates. The CineLink Market each year presents about 10 finest regional projects for feature-length fiction films, also offering festival guests a special opportunity to meet with the assembled regional industry, with emphasis on young filmmakers, producers and directors presenting their latest projects, productions and works in progress, with highlights of the regional production presented to international distributors, TV-buyers and festival programmers, making CineLink the most important international market place for new features from Southeast Europe.

The first edition of CineLink, which was part of the 9th Sarajevo Film Festival, was held in 2003. Of the 91 entries from across the region, a three-member jury, Philippe Bober, Behrooz Hashemian and Čedomir Kolar, producers whose films have won awards at all the major international film festivals such as Cannes, Venice, Rotterdam and Berlin, chose six winning films, and the winners were: The Abandoned - Zlatko Topčić, Bosnian Pot - Vedran Fajković, Slowly - Nikola Mišić, Totally Personal - Nedžad Begović, Roses for Tosca - Branko Đurić, Simona Stražisar and Last Day - Namik Kabil.

In 2019, the Academy of Motion Picture Arts and Sciences awarded the Sarajevo Film Festival the status of the Academy Award qualifying film festival in the Short Film category. Short films that win the Heart of Sarajevo Award and the nomination for the European Film Academy (EFA) short film award at the Sarajevo Film Festival will be eligible for consideration in the Animated Short Film and Live Action Short Film category of the Academy Awards without the standard theatrical run, provided that they otherwise comply with the Academy rules.

Festival programmes and awards

Programs
Competition (feature, short and documentary)
CineLink Industry Days
Talents Sarajevo
In Focus 

Tribute to
Open Air
Summer Screen
European Shorts
Children's Program
TeenArena
Avant Premieres
Operation Kino
Dealing with the past
Humman Rights Day
Sarajevo Film Festival Partnert Presents (Doha Film Institute)
BH Film

Awards
Heart of Sarajevo for Best Feature Film
Special Jury Prize
Heart of Sarajevo for Best Actor
Heart of Sarajevo for Best Actress
Heart of Sarajevo for Best Short Film
Heart of Sarajevo for Best Documentary Film
Special Jury Prize for Documentary Film
Human Rights Award
Honorary Heart of Sarajevo
Ivica Matić Award

Talents Sarajevo
Talents Sarajevo is a program launched in 2007, under the name Sarajevo Talent Campus, in co-operation with the Berlin International Film Festival and the Berlinale Talent Campus. Talents Sarajevo is an educational and networking platform for emerging film talents from Southeast Europe (Azerbaijan, Bosnia and Herzegovina, Bulgaria, Croatia, Greece, Hungary, Kosovo, Moldova, Montenegro, North Macedonia, Romania, Slovenia, Serbia and Turkey). Each year, more than two hundred applications are received, and only eighty are carefully chosen to attend a six-day training led by some of the most prominent film professionals in the world. In addition to meeting other filmmakers and film professionals, young filmmakers are introduced to the work of established film professionals, informed about current trends and issues in the industry, and introduced to the international filmmaking community.

Gallery

See also

Heart of Sarajevo
Ivica Matić Award 
Bosnian-Herzegovinian Film Festival
MESS (festival)
List of Bosnia and Herzegovina films
Cinema of Europe
List of cinema of the world
World cinema

References

External links

Sarajevo Film Festival - Official Website
IMDb: Sarajevo Film Festival - SFF at IMDb

 
Film festivals established in 1995
Tourist attractions in Sarajevo
1995 establishments in Bosnia and Herzegovina
Annual events in Bosnia and Herzegovina
Summer events in Bosnia and Herzegovina
Film festivals in Sarajevo